Geminj (also Romanized as Gīmenj and Giminj; also known as Gemīj) is a village in Jolgeh-e Mazhan Rural District, Jolgeh-e Mazhan District, Khusf County, South Khorasan Province, Iran. At the 2006 census, its population was 18, in 6 families.

References 

Populated places in Khusf County